Zapandí Riverine Wetlands, is a nature reserve in Guanacaste Province, northwestern Costa Rica, created by decree 22732-MIRENEM in 1993.

The nature reserve is within the Guanacaste Conservation Area, Tempisque Conservation Area and Arenal Tempisque Conservation Area.

Nature
Zapandí Riverine Wetlands protects low wetlands around the Quebrada Grande and the Ahogados River,  in the Tempisque River watershed.

See also
Area de Conservación Guanacaste World Heritage Site

References

External links 
 Costa Rica National Parks: Riberino Zapandi Wetlands

Nature reserves in Costa Rica
Wetlands of Costa Rica
Geography of Guanacaste Province